The  2010 Beijing Guoan F.C. season  was the 7th consecutive season in the Chinese Super League, established in 2004, and 20th consecutive season in the top flight of Chinese football. They competed at the Chinese Super League and AFC Champions League.

First team
As of July 8, 2010

Transfers

Winter

In:

 

Out:

Summer

In:

Out:

Friendlies

Mid–season

Competitions

Chinese Super League

Matches

AFC Champions League

Group stage

Knock-out stage

Round of 16

References

Beijing Guoan F.C. seasons
Chinese football clubs 2010 season